Edward F. Flanagan (April 10, 1910 – August 1, 1978) was an American hammer thrower. He won the national title in 1931, placed third in 1930, and finished sixth in 1932.

References

American male hammer throwers
1910 births
Year of death unknown